Gallargues-le-Montueux is a commune in the Gard department in southern France.

Geography

Gallargues-le-Montueux is situated near the river Vidourle, 6 km northeast of Lunel and 20 km southwest of Nîmes. Gallargues station has rail connections to Nîmes, Avignon and Montpellier.

Climate

The climate is hot-summer Mediterranean (Köppen: Csa). It was initially reported as the highest temperature in French meteorological history, but a subsequent review of measurements by Météo-France determined that the temperature reached  in nearby Verargues.

Population

Education
There is a public preschool/nursery (ecole maternelle) as well as the public Ecole Elementaire la Maurelle.

The collège (junior high school) serving the community is Collège de Gallargues-le-Montueux. In addition to Gallargues-le-Montueux, it also serves Aigues-Vives and Aimargues. It opened in September 2014.  it has about 600 students.

See also
 Pont Ambroix
Communes of the Gard department

References

External links

 Gallargues-le-Montueux

 on June 28, 2019, the highest temperature ever recorded in France - 45.8C - was experienced here.

Gallargueslemontueux